The .458×2-inch American is a straight, belted, .458 caliber (11.6 mm) big-bore cartridge designed by Frank Barnes.

General Information
The .458×2-inch American was designed as a medium-power big-bore cartridge by Frank Barnes for North American big game. Frank Barnes found that the .458 Winchester Magnum and the .460 Weatherby Magnum too powerful for North American big game and believed that a cartridge of lesser power would be ample for the task.

The cartridge has the power required to take all North American big game species.  It is also adequate for African dangerous game in close cover.

The .450 Marlin and the .458×2-inch American are very similar cartridges. The cartridges are essentially the same length. However, the .450 Marlin will not chamber in the .458×2-inch American as the belt on the .450 Marlin is considerably wider. The .458×2-inch American should not be fired in a .450 Marlin as failures may occur. While not interchangeable, the .458×2-inch American will do anything the .450 Marlin is capable of accomplishing, and converting such a rifle to .450 Marlin is fairly straightforward.

The .458×2-inch American was intended for bolt-action rifles. The first rifle chambered for the cartridge was a customized Remington Model 722. The cartridge also can be chambered for the Winchester Model 94 lever action rifle.

Ammunition can be made from .375 H&H Magnum cases and cases derived from it, including the .458 Winchester Magnum. Dies are available from RCBS and chamber reamers from H&M Tool Company.

.458×2-inch American has remained a wildcat caliber, as no factory rifles or ammunition were offered in this caliber.

Dimensions

References

External links

Pistol and rifle cartridges